The scarab beetle subfamily Scarabaeinae consists of species collectively called true dung beetles. Most of the beetles of this subfamily feed exclusively on dung. However, some may feed on decomposing matter including carrion, decaying fruits and fungi. Dung beetles can be placed into three structural guilds based on their method of dung processing namely rollers, dwellers and tunnelers  Dung removal and burial by dung beetles result in ecological benefits such as soil aeration and fertilization; improved nutrient cycling and uptake by plants, increase in Pasture quality, biological control of pest flies and intestinal parasites and secondary seed dispersal. Well-known members include the genera Scarabaeus and Sisyphus, and Phanaeus vindex.

Description 

Adult dung beetles have modified mouth parts which are adapted to feeding on dung. The clypeus is expanded and covers the mouth parts. The elytra, which cover the wings, expose the pygidium. They also have a space between their middle legs to allow for manipulation of the dung. Dung beetles can be large beetles of a few inches in size to small beetles which are only a few millimeters in size

Guilds 
Dung beetles are classified into groups based on their method of processing the dung. Rollers are beetles that construct balls of dung from the main food source. They roll away this ball from the position of the original food source and use the dung for feeding or for reproduction. Tunnelers are beetles that dig tunnels beneath the food source creating nests. They relocate food into their nest for reproduction and feeding. Lastly, dwellers are beetles that live and reproduce inside the food source rarely creating nests.

Reproduction 
Pheromones are thought to aid in dung beetle reproduction. Dung beetles copulate after which both parents dig a tunnel to lay the eggs. This tunnel may have different branches leading to varying egg chambers or may not be branched depending on species. Both parents take dung inside the tunnels in the form of brood balls and the females lay the egg inside the dung. When the larva hatches it feeds on the surrounding dung and forms a pupa undergoing several instars. After this stage the pupa hatches and the newly formed adult evades the tunnel and searches for a fresh dung supply for feeding. After approximately 2 weeks the new adult beetle will be able to reproduce.

Ecology

Dung beetle communities are dependent on vegetation and presence of mammalian dung resource. In an area with a lot of vegetation, the dung pads are preserved longer for dung beetle utilization. Vegetation provides conditions suitable for vertebrate trafficking allowing more dung presence in the area. In areas with little vegetation, limited vertebrate fauna may be present limiting the types of dung present. Also, with little vegetation the canopy of the forest may be limiting. This causes the dung pads to be exposed to sunlight, higher temperature and wind action. These factors contribute to dung pad desiccation which decreases the period of suitable dung availability. Dung beetles of different groups may respond to changes in vegetation in different ways.

A decline in dung beetle diversity associated with the conversion of native forests to open pastures is known to occur. However, some species are able to utilize dung in open pasture conditions. Tunneler species are able to utilize dung in less optimal condition because the tunnel beneath the dung and utilize it from bottom up. As desiccation occurs on the top of the dung pad, the middle and lower regions may still be suitable for the dung beetle.  Also, smaller species are able to survive in such conditions as they require less dung.  Larger beetles require larger amounts of dung which may not be available due to the fast desiccation of the dung pads in these conditions. Soil hardness and dryness negatively affect the tunnelers. Species able to tolerate open pasture conditions were extremely abundant. The reduction in the number of dung beetles affected the efficiency of their ecological roles and it was found that dung removal and burial declined. Dung removal and burial by dung beetles result in ecological benefits such as soil aeration and fertilization. These benefits lead to improved nutrient cycling and uptake by plants, increase in pasture quality, biological control of pest flies and intestinal parasites and secondary seed dispersal. Therefore, their role in the ecosystem is essential.

Taxonomy
The subfamily is split into about 12 extant tribes. These can be grouped by their distribution, though the present classification is expected to require major revision based on recent phylogenetic analyses.

Tribes with a global distribution
Ateuchini - about 20 genera including:
 Pedaria
 Sarophorus

Coprini (incl. Dichotomiini) - about 20 genera including:
 Copris Geoffroy, 1762
 Dichotomius
 Heliocopris
 Metacatharsius

Deltochilini (= Canthonini) - about 120 genera including:
 Anachalcos Hope, 1837
 Canthon Hoffmannsegg, 1817
 Circellium Latreille, 1825
 Deltochilum
 Dicranocara Frolov and Scholtz, 2003
 Epirinus Reiche, 1841
 Parachorius
 Versicorpus Deschodt Davis and Scholtz, 2011

Onthophagini - about 40 genera including:
 Hyalonthophagus
 Onthophagus
 Proagoderus

Predominantly Old World (New World presence likely represents rather recent dispersal)
Oniticellini (incl. Eurysternini) - 16 genera including:
 Euoniticellus Janssens, 1953
 Oniticellus Serville, 1825
 Eurysternus
Sisyphini - three genera (sometimes placed in the Scarabaeini):
 Nesosisyphus
 Neosisyphus
 Sisyphus

Old World
Gymnopleurini - four genera (sometimes placed in the Scarabaeini):
 Allogymnopleurus
 Garreta Janssens, 1940
 Gymnopleurus Illiger, 1803
 Paragymnopleurus
Scarabaeini - selected genera:
 Scarabaeus (Kheper is a subgenus)
Onitini - selected genera:
 Bubas Mulsant, 1842
 Cheironitis Lansberge, 1875
 Onitis Fabricius, 1798

New World
Eucraniini - four genera:
 Anomiopsoides
 Ennearabdus
 Eucranium
 Glyphoderus
Phanaeini - 12 genera including:
 Oxysternon
 Phanaeus

References

External links

Subfamily Scarabaeinae: photographs of representatives of the tribes

 
Extant Eocene first appearances